The 1932 United States presidential election in Ohio was held on November 8, 1932 as part of the 1932 United States presidential election. State voters chose 26 electors to the Electoral College, who voted for president and vice president. 

Ohio was narrowly won by the Democratic Party candidate, Franklin D. Roosevelt, with 49.88% of the popular vote. The Republican Party candidate, President Herbert Hoover, garnered 47.03% of the popular vote. , this is the only election since the Civil War in which Fulton County has voted for a Democratic presidential candidate, and the last when Union County has done so.

Even though Roosevelt won a majority of Ohio's counties along with the popular vote, the state voted almost 15% to the right of the national average in this election; a Republican tilt which has not been exceeded to this day even as Donald Trump decisively ended its bellwether status in 2020.

Results

Results by county

See also
 United States presidential elections in Ohio

Notes

References

Ohio
1932
1932 Ohio elections